The 1998 Ballon d'Or, given to the best football player in Europe as judged by a panel of sports journalists from UEFA member countries, was awarded to Zinedine Zidane on 22 December 1998.

Rankings

Additionally, nineteen players were nominated but received no votes: Tony Adams, Roberto Baggio, Zvonimir Boban, Fabio Cannavaro, Denílson, Tore André Flo, Adrian Ilie, Filippo Inzaghi, Robert Jarni, Hidetoshi Nakata, Pavel Nedvěd, Sunday Oliseh, Ariel Ortega, Gianluca Pagliuca, Marcelo Salas, David Seaman, Andriy Shevchenko, Juan Sebastián Verón and Iván Zamorano.

References

External links
 France Football Official Ballon d'Or page

1998
1998–99 in European football